Ho Bisgaltu (浩 華斯哈拉圖, Pinyin: Hào Huá-sī-hā-lā-tú; born 21 March 1968) is a Chinese wrestler. He competed at the 1988 Summer Olympics and the 1992 Summer Olympics.

References

External links
 

1968 births
Living people
Chinese male sport wrestlers
Olympic wrestlers of China
Wrestlers at the 1988 Summer Olympics
Wrestlers at the 1992 Summer Olympics
Place of birth missing (living people)
21st-century Chinese people
20th-century Chinese people